Alexander II served as Greek Patriarch of Alexandria between 1059 and 1062.

References

11th-century Patriarchs of Alexandria
Melkites in the Fatimid Caliphate